Transport System Bögl (TSB) is a maglev system for driverless trains developed by the German construction company Max Bögl since 2010. Its primary intended use is for short to medium distances (up to 30 km) and speeds up to 150 km/h for uses such as airport shuttles. The company has been doing test runs on an 820 meter long test track at their headquarters in Sengenthal, Upper Palatinate, Germany since 2012 clocking over 100,000 tests covering a distance of over 65,000 km as of 2018.

Technical data

Chinese joint venture
In 2018 Max Bögl signed a joint venture with the Chinese company  Chengdu Xinzhu Road & Bridge Machinery Co. Ltd. to build a 3.5 km test track in Chengdu, China. The Chinese partner is to be given exclusive rights of production and marketing for the system in China. In 2020 the first cars intended for use on the Chinese test track were carried by truck to Munich Airport and then flown by Antonov An-124 cargo plane to their destination for a planned entry into test-service later that year.

Proposals for use as airport shuttle
In February 2020 the German ministry of transportation announced a feasibility study for the use of TSB at Munich Airport.
In June 2020 the CDU Berlin (then in opposition at the state level) proposed to build a line of the TSB to Berlin Brandenburg Airport citing alleged cost benefits as compared to an extension of the  Berlin U-Bahn.

References

External links
Transport System Bögl - company website including technical specifications.

Driverless Maglev